Michael John Procter (born 15 September 1946) is a South African former cricketer. A fast bowler and hard hitting batsman, he proved himself a colossal competitor in English first class cricket. He was denied the international stage by South Africa's banishment from world cricket in the 1970s and 1980s. He was a Wisden Cricketer of the Year in 1970 and South African cricketer of the year in 1967.

Following his retirement from the playing the game, Procter was appointed as a match referee by ICC for officiating cricket matches. However, his tenure has been marked by controversies.

Early and personal life
Educated at Hilton College, he played for Natal in the Nuffield week and for South African schools in 1963 and 1964. His brother, AW Procter, cousin AC Procter and father WC Procter all played first-class cricket.

Procter married tennis player Maryna Godwin, who won the 1962 Border Junior Women's Singles Championship by beating Pam Watermeyer 6–2 6–0, and who reached the third round of the 1967 Wimbledon Championships – Women's singles, the third round of the 1966 and 1967 French Championships and the 1968 French Open, and the quarterfinals of the 1968 U.S. Open – Women's singles.

Playing career

International career
The ban on South Africa restricted his Test career to a mere seven appearances, all of them against Australia, between 1967 and 1970. 41 Test wickets at an average of 15.02 suggest what he might have achieved in the coming years had South Africa not enacted a racist Apartheid policy, which had their international sporting teams banned. Along with Barry Richards and Graeme Pollock, Procter was responsible for his side inflicting two successive series defeats on Australia by margins of 3–1 and 4–0.

Procter played for the Rest of the World versus England in 1970, and took 15 wickets at an average of 23.9 in five test-format matches.

He also captained the Springbok team that played in three "tests" and three "one day internationals" against an English rebel XI, led by Graham Gooch, that toured South Africa in 1982.

In 1978/79, towards the end of his playing career, he played for the World XI in Kerry Packer's World Series of Cricket in Australia. He performed with bat and ball in the three "SuperTests" in which he played - his batting average was 34.2 and his bowling average 18.6.

South African domestic cricket
Procter is the only man to make over 500 runs and take 50 wickets twice in a domestic South African season, in 1971–72 and 1972–73, when he took a then record 59 wickets in eight Currie Cup games.  In 1970 he entered the record books, to join the exalted company of Sir Donald Bradman and C.B. Fry, in scoring six successive first-class centuries for Rhodesia. He played for and captained South Africa in 1 unofficial "Test".

Proctershire
He played county cricket for 13 years as an overseas player for Gloucestershire and led them to great success. Fans even jokingly renamed the team Proctershire. His whirlwind, chest-on pace bowling lifted Gloucestershire from the unfashionable depths of the county championship to second in 1969 as he blasted his way to over a hundred wickets.  Four centuries followed in 1971, the last lifting them from 28 for three to a target of 201 in just over two hours against Yorkshire.  Procter scored 109 not out in Gloucestershire's 135/3 in the 1974 John Player League – the lowest team total in List A cricket to include a century. He destroyed Worcestershire single-handedly in 1977, scoring a century before lunch and taking 13 wickets for just 73 runs.  He picked up another century before lunch in 1979, against Leicestershire, winning the Walter Lawrence Trophy for the season's fastest century, and then ripped through their batsmen with a hat-trick for good measure.  Procter defied insurmountable odds in the very next game, against Yorkshire, by taking another hat-trick, all trapped leg-before.  The potency of his muscular inswinging fast bowling can be seen by the fact that his feat of taking two hat-tricks of LBWs is unique in the first class game.  He captained them with distinction from 1977 to 1981 and was hugely popular with teammates and supporters alike.  He was the Professional Cricketers' Association Player of the Year in 1970 and 1977 and won the Cricket Society Wetherall Award for the Leading All-Rounder in English First-Class Cricket in 1978.

As captain he led Gloucestershire to the Benson & Hedges Cup in 1977, as director of coaching he guided Northamptonshire CCC to their triumph in the 1989–90 NatWest Trophy final and in 1994 he was coach as Kepler Wessels' South African team stunned England at Lord's by 356 runs. As a player Procter had beaten England there in 1970 with the Rest of the World XI and won the Gillette Cup for Gloucestershire in 1973, scoring 94 and taking two wickets against Sussex.

"I never really bothered much about averages, I was more concerned with how the team did, so to never lose a big game at Lord's was a highlight, plus there was winning all the Super Tests in Australia during World Series Cricket and all those Currie Cups with Natal," Procter told Cricinfo "And, of course, winning all those Test matches in South Africa against the Aussies."

Style
As a bowler, Procter had an awkward chest on action, seeming to bowl off the wrong foot (though not actually doing so) at the end of an intimidating run.  His unusual action generated late inswing which, in the right conditions, could be unplayable at times. He bowled at high pace in his pomp but later in his career knee problems caused by the impact of his bull-like body on the bowling crease forced him to turn to off-spin.  Typically he proved adept at this too.  His muscular batting in the middle order was famed for its power, although based on a sound defence.  He was one of those rare cricketers who could have found a place in any test team as either a batsman or bowler and who could win a game single handed with bat or ball in his hand.

Post-retirement involvement in cricket
After retiring, Procter was director of cricket for the Free State and Natal provinces in South Africa, as well as Northamptonshire county. He was then appointed as the first post-isolation coach of the South African cricket team, and was the coach for tours of India (in 1991), the West Indies (which included South Africa's first post-isolation test, Sri Lanka and Australia.

Match referee
Mike Procter has been in controversial incidents in his career as a match referee. He refereed the forfeited Oval Test of August 2006 when Pakistan refused to take the field after tea in protest at the umpires’ decision to penalise them for ball tampering. During the Second Test, 2007–08 Border–Gavaskar Trophy, Procter banned Harbhajan Singh for three matches on charges of racism.  This decision was later overturned by Justice Hansen. At the first hearing Proctor  established that the neither umpire, nor Ricky Ponting, nor Sachin Tendulkar, who was closest to the incident, had heard anything. At the second hearing, however, Justice Hansen uncovered that Tendulkar heard the heated exchange between Andrew Symonds and Harbhajan including the exact Hindi phrase, and Ponting 'couldn't understand why Sachin didn't tell this to Mike Procter in the first place.' Procter had been criticised for his original decision and Sunil Gavaskar questioned whether his sympathies lay with the Australian team due to his race.

Notes

External links
 

1946 births
Living people
South African people of British descent
White South African people
Free State cricketers
Gloucestershire cricket captains
Gloucestershire cricketers
KwaZulu-Natal cricketers
Alumni of Hilton College (South Africa)
Alumni of Highbury Preparatory School
Rhodesia cricketers
South Africa Test cricketers
South African cricketers
Western Province cricketers
World Series Cricket players
Wisden Cricketers of the Year
Wisden Leading Cricketers in the World
Cricket match referees
Coaches of the South Africa national cricket team